Katharine (Kat) Holmes (born July 15, 1993) is an American fencer. She competed in the women's épée event at the 2016 and 2020 Summer Olympics. She was a world champion in the women’s epee team event (Wuxi, China 2018), which was the first World Championship medal won by an American women’s epee team, defeating Korea in overtime in the finals. She also anchored the United States women’s epee team to its first World Cup gold medal (Dubai 2018), defeating Russia in overtime in the finals. She was the back-to-back gold medalist in both the individual and team events at the Pan American Games in Lima in 2019 and Toronto in 2015. She qualified to represent the United States in fencing at the 2020 Olympics in Tokyo in 2021.

Holmes fenced for Princeton University from 2011-2014, took two years off to train, qualify and compete in the 2016 Olympic Games in Rio, then returned to Princeton in 2016, graduating in 2017 magna cum laude with departmental honors. While at Princeton, she was a four-time All American fencer and four-time All Ivy League fencer. She was individual 2017 Ivy League Champion and team Ivy League Champion in 2012, 2013, 2014 and 2017. She also competed on the team that won Princeton’s first NCAA Fencing Championship in 2013. In 2018, Holmes was awarded the Fair Play Award for exemplary sportsmanship by the Federation International d'Escrime

References

External links
 

1993 births
Living people
American female épée fencers
Fencers at the 2010 Summer Youth Olympics
Olympic fencers of the United States
Fencers at the 2016 Summer Olympics
Fencers at the 2020 Summer Olympics
Place of birth missing (living people)
Universiade medalists in fencing
Pan American Games medalists in fencing
Pan American Games gold medalists for the United States
Fencers at the 2015 Pan American Games
Universiade silver medalists for the United States
Medalists at the 2017 Summer Universiade
Medalists at the 2015 Pan American Games
21st-century American women